Torben Skovlyst is a Danish orienteering competitor and World champion. He won a gold medal in the 1997 World Orienteering Championships in Grimstad with the Danish relay team (Carsten Jørgensen, Chris Terkelsen and Allan Mogensen).

See also
 Danish orienteers
 List of orienteers
 List of orienteering events

References

External links
 

Year of birth missing (living people)
Living people
Danish orienteers
Male orienteers
Foot orienteers
World Orienteering Championships medalists